Kheyrabad (also Romanized as Kheyrābād and Khāirābād) is a village in Zeynabad Rural District, Shal District, Buin Zahra County, Qazvin Province, Iran. At the 2006 census, its population was 327, in 64 families.

References 

Populated places in Buin Zahra County